Blanco Independent School District is a public school district based in Blanco, Texas (USA).  Located in Blanco County, portions of the district extend into Kendall and Hays counties.

Finances
As of the 2010–2011 school year, the appraised valuation of property in the district was $654,434,000. The maintenance tax rate was $0.104 and the bond tax rate was $0.011 per $100 of appraised valuation.

Academic achievement
In 2011, the school district was rated "academically acceptable" by the Texas Education Agency.  Forty-nine percent of districts in Texas in 2011 received the same rating. No state accountability ratings will be given to districts in 2012. A school district in Texas can receive one of four possible rankings from the Texas Education Agency: Exemplary (the highest possible ranking), Recognized, Academically Acceptable, and Academically Unacceptable (the lowest possible ranking).

Historical TEA accountability ratings 
2011: Academically Acceptable
2010: Recognized
2009: Recognized
2008: Academically Acceptable
2007: Academically Acceptable
2006: Academically Acceptable
2005: Academically Acceptable
2004: Academically Acceptable

Schools 
Blanco High School (Grades 9-12)
Blanco Middle (Grades 6-8)
2001-02 National Blue Ribbon School
Blanco Elementary (Grades PK-5)

Special programs

Athletics
For the 2016 through 2018 school years, Blanco High School will play football in UIL Class 3A Division II.

See also

List of school districts in Texas 
List of high schools in Texas

References

External links 

School districts in Blanco County, Texas
School districts in Kendall County, Texas
School districts in Hays County, Texas